Matteo Guardalben (born 5 June 1974) is an Italian former professional football goalkeeper.

Club career
Guardalben was born in Nogara, Province of Verona. After five seasons with Parma, Guardalben (along with Nicola Mora and Matuzalém) joined Piacenza in a co-ownership deal. Half of Guardalben's rights was valued for 3 billion lire.

Guardalben was exchanged with Cristiano Lupatelli in January 2006.

Guardalben signed a three-year contract with Vicenza of Serie B in July 2006, as Adriano Zancopè's backup, but he was injured in October and back to squad in May 2007.

In the next season, he became the first choice since November 2007, until February 2008 the arrival of Marco Fortin.

In summer 2009, he was signed by Serie A club U.C. Sampdoria as third-choice keeper, and never played a single game during his stay with the blucerchiati. In July 2010 he was signed by Serie B club Modena in a free transfer.

International career
In 2005, Guardalben was called up three times by the Italy national football team, all as unused substitute.

References

External links
ilpalermocalcio.it

Living people
1974 births
Sportspeople from the Province of Verona
Association football goalkeepers
Italian footballers
Hellas Verona F.C. players
U.S. Massese 1919 players
Parma Calcio 1913 players
Piacenza Calcio 1919 players
Palermo F.C. players
L.R. Vicenza players
Treviso F.B.C. 1993 players
U.C. Sampdoria players
Modena F.C. players
Serie A players
Serie B players
Footballers from Veneto